The 2012–13 Heineken Cup pool stage was the first stage of the 18th season of the Heineken Cup, Europe's top competition for rugby union clubs. It involved 24 teams competing for eight quarter-final berths, awarded to the winners of each of six pools plus the two top-ranked second-place teams.  The next three best runners-up were parachuted into the Amlin Challenge Cup.

The pool stage began with two matches on 12 October 2012 and ended on 20 January 2013.  The first four rounds of fixtures were released on 26 July 2012.  The quarter-finalists then participated in a knockout tournament that ultimately ended with the final on Saturday 18 May 2013 at Aviva Stadium in Dublin.

Seeding
The seeding system was the same as in the 2011–12 tournament. The 24 competing teams were ranked based on past Heineken Cup and European Challenge Cup performance, with each pool receiving one team from each quartile, or Tier. The requirement to have only one team per country in each pool, however, still applied (with the exception of the inclusion of the seventh French team).

The brackets show each team's European Rugby Club Ranking at the end of the 2011–12 season.

Pool stage
The draw for the pool stage took place on 12 June 2012 at Aviva Stadium.

Under rules of the competition organiser, European Rugby Cup, tiebreakers within each pool are as follows.
 Competition points earned in head-to-head matches
 Total tries scored in head-to-head matches
 Point differential in head-to-head matches

ERC has four additional tiebreakers, used if tied teams are in different pools, or if the above steps cannot break a tie between teams in the same pool:
 Tries scored in all pool matches
 Point differential in all pool matches
 Best disciplinary record (fewest players receiving red or yellow cards in all pool matches)
 Coin toss

All kickoff times are local to the match location.

Pool 1

Pool 2

Pool 3

Pool 4

Pool 5

Pool 6

See also
 2012–13 Heineken Cup

References

External links
Official ERC website
2012–13 Heineken Cup at ESPN

Pool Stage
Heineken Cup pool stages